The Takatof Program for Social Volunteering is a nationwide volunteering initiative in the United Arab Emirates. It is one of the principal initiatives of the Emirates Foundation, a charitable organisation established in 2007 in the UAE under the patronage of His Highness Sheikh Mohammed bin Zayed Al Nahyan, Crown Prince of Abu Dhabi and the Deputy Supreme Commander of UAE Armed Forces.  Takatof was launched in Abu Dhabi in April 2007 with an inaugural school renovation event.

References 

Charities based in the United Arab Emirates